McN5652 is a molecule that can be radiolabeled and then used as a radioligand in positron emission tomography (PET) studies. The [11C]-(+)-McN5652 enantiomer binds to the serotonin transporter. The radioligand is used for molecular neuroimaging and for imaging of the lungs.

It was developed by Johnson & Johnson's McNeil Laboratories.  According to McNeil, McN5652 was among the strongest SRI ever reported at the time of its discovery (sub nM Ki). However, it is not completely 5-HT selective: the racemate has 5-HT=0.68, NA=2.9, and D=36.8nM, whereas (+)-enantiomer has  5-HT=0.39, NA=1.8, and D=23.5 nM. Paroxetine was listed as 5-HT=0.44 nM, NA=20, and DA=460nM in the same paper by the same authors.

Derivatives
McN5652 and related structures have been analyzed for QSAR in terms of binding to the MAT receptor binding site.

See also 
 DASB
 JNJ-7925476 (p-ethynyl)

References 

Pyrroloisoquinolines
Radiopharmaceuticals
Neuroimaging
Johnson & Johnson brands
Thioethers